Edison Vasilievich Denisov (6 April 1929 – 24 November 1996) was a Russian composer in the so-called "Underground",  "alternative" or "nonconformist"  division of Soviet music.

Biography

Denisov was born in Tomsk, Siberia. He studied mathematics before deciding to spend his life composing. This decision was enthusiastically supported by Dmitri Shostakovich, who gave him lessons in composition.

In 1951–56 Denisov studied at the Moscow Conservatory: composition with Vissarion Shebalin, orchestration with Nikolai Rakov, analysis with Viktor Tsukkerman and piano with Vladimir Belov. In 1956–59 he composed the opera Ivan-Soldat (Soldier Ivan) in three acts based on Russian folk fairy tales.

He began his own study of scores that were difficult to obtain in the USSR at that time, including music by composers ranging from Mahler and Debussy to Boulez and Stockhausen. He wrote a series of articles giving a detailed analysis of different aspects of contemporary compositional techniques and at same time actively experimented as a composer, trying to find his own way.

After graduating from the Moscow Conservatory, he taught orchestration and later composition there. His pupils included the composers Dmitri Smirnov, Elena Firsova, Vladimir Tarnopolsky, Sergey Pavlenko, Ivan Sokolov, Yuri Kasparov, Dmitri Kapyrin, and Aleksandr Shchetinskiy. 

In 1979, at the Sixth Congress of the Union of Soviet Composers, he was blacklisted as one of "Khrennikov's Seven" for unapproved participation in a number of festivals of Soviet music in the West.

Denisov became a leader of the Association for Contemporary Music reestablished in Moscow in 1990. Later he moved to France, where after an accident and long illness he died in a Saint-Mandé hospital in 1996.

Music
Denisov's cycle for soprano and chamber ensemble Le soleil des Incas (1964), setting poems by Gabriela Mistral and dedicated to Pierre Boulez, brought him international recognition following a series of successful performances of the work in Darmstadt and Paris (1965). Igor Stravinsky liked the piece, discovering the "remarkable talent" of its composer. However, it was harshly criticised by the Union of Soviet Composers for its "western influences", "erudition instead of creativity", and "total composer's arbitrary" (Tikhon Khrennikov). After that, performances of his works were frequently banned in the Soviet Union.

Later he wrote a flute concerto for Aurèle Nicolet, a violin concerto for Gidon Kremer, works for the oboist Heinz Holliger, clarinettist Eduard Brunner and a sonata for alto saxophone and piano for Jean-Marie Londeix, that became highly popular among saxophone players.

His sombre but striking Requiem, setting a multi-lingual text (English, French, German, and Latin) based on works by the German writer Francisco Tanzer, was given its first performance in Hamburg in 1980.

Among his major works are the operas L'écume des jours after Boris Vian (1981), Quatre Filles after Pablo Picasso (1986) and ballet Confession after Alfred de Musset.

Honours and awards
 People's Artist of the Russian Federation
 Honoured Artist of the RSFSR
 Chevalier of the Legion of Honour
 Commander of the Order of Arts and Letters

Selected works
1956–9 Soldier Ivan opera in three acts after motifs from Russian folk fairy tales
1958 Sonata for Two Violins
1960 Sonata for Flute and Piano
1964 Le soleil des Incas (Солнце инков—The Sun of Incas), text by Gabriela Mistral for soprano, flute, oboe, horn, trumpet, two pianos, percussion, violin and cello
1964 Italian Songs, text by Alexander Blok for soprano, flute, horn, violin and harpsichord
1966 Les pleurs (Плачи—Lamentations), text of Russian folksongs for soprano, piano and three percussionists
1968 Ode (in Memory of Che Guevara) for clarinet, piano and percussion
1968 Musique Romantique (Романтическая музыка—Romantic Music) for oboe, harp and string trio
1968 Autumn (Осень) after Velemir Khlebnikov for thirteen solo voices
1969 String Trio
1969 Wind Quintet
1969 Silhouettes for flute, two pianos and percussion
1969 Chant des Oiseaux (Пение птиц) for prepared piano (or harpsichord) and tape
1969 DSCH for clarinet, trombone, cello and piano
1969 The Singing of the Birds for the ANS photoelectronic synthesizer
1970 Two Songs after poems by Ivan Bunin for soprano and piano
1970 Peinture (Живопись—Painting) for orchestra
1970 Sonate for alto saxophone and piano, premiered by Londeix at the 1970 World Saxophone Congress in Chicago.
1971 Piano Trio
1972 Cello Concerto

1973 La vie en rouge (Жизнь в красном цвете—The Life in Red), text by Boris Vian for solo voice, flute, clarinet, violin, cello, piano and percussion
1974 Piano Concerto
1974 Signes en blanc (Знаки на белом—The Signs on White) for piano
1975 Choral Varié for trombone and piano
1975 Flute Concerto
1977 Violin Concerto
1977 Concerto Piccolo for saxophone and six percussionists
1980 Requiem after liturgian texts and poems by Francisco Tanzer for soprano, tenor, mixed chorus and orchestra
1981 L'écume des jours (Пена дней—The Foam of Days), an opera after Boris Vian
1982 Tod ist ein langer Schlaf (Смерть—это долгий сон—Death is a Long Sleep)—Variations on Haydn's Canon for cello and orchestra
1982 Chamber Symphony No. 1
1982  Concerto for bassoon, cello and orchestra
1983 Five Etudes for Solo Bassoon
1984 Confession (Исповедь), a ballet in three acts after Alfred de Musset
1985 Three Pictures after Paul Klee for viola, oboe, horn, piano, vibraphone and double bass
1986 Quatre Filles (Четыре девушки—The Four Girls), an opera in one act after Pablo Picasso
1986 Viola Concerto
1986 Oboe Concerto
1987 Symphony No. 1
1987 Clarinet Quintet
1989 Clarinet Concerto
1989 Four Poems after G. de Nerval for voice, flute and piano
1991 Guitar Concerto
1992 History of Life and Death of Our Lord Jesus Christus according to St. Matthew for bass, tenor, chorus and orchestra
1993 Sonata for clarinet and piano
1993 Concerto for flute, vibraphone, harpsichord and string orchestra
1993 Completion of Debussy's opera Rodrigue et Chimène
1994 Chamber Symphony No. 2
1994 Sonata for alto saxophone and cello
1995 Morning Dream after seven poems of Rose Ausländer for soprano, mixed chorus and orchestra
1995 Choruses for Medea for chorus and ensemble
1995 Completion of Schubert's opera-oratorio Lazarus oder Die Feier der Auferstehung  (Лазарь и торжество Воскрешения) D689
1995 Trio for flute, bassoon and piano
1995 Des ténèbres à la lumière (From Dusk to Light) for accordion. Publ.: Paris, Leduc, 1996. Dur. 15'.
1996 Symphony No. 2 (March)
1996 Three Cadenzas for Mozart's Concerto for flute and harp (April–May)
1996 Sonata for two flutes (May)
1996 Concerto for flute and clarinet with orchestra (July)
1996 Femme et oiseaux (The Woman and the Birds) homage to Joan Miró for piano, string quartet and woodwind quartet (July–August)
1996 Avant le coucher du soleil for alto flute and vibraphone (the last work, completed 16 August).

References

Bibliography
 Armengaud J.-P. Entretiens avec Denisov, un compositeur sous le régime soviétique. P., 1993 
   ||  
 Yuri Kholopov & Valeria Tsenova: Edison Denisov—The Russian Voice in European New Music; Berlin, Kuhn, 2002 
   
 Brian Luce:  Light from Behind the Iron Curtain:  Anti-Collectivist Style in Edison Denisov's "Quatre Pièces pour Flûte et Piano;"  UMI, Ann Arbor, 2000 
 Peter Schmelz:  Listening, Memory, and the Thaw: Unofficial Music and Society in the Soviet Union, 1956–1974, PhD Dissertation, University of California (Richard Taruskin, advisor), 2002 
 Peter Schmelz:  Such Freedom, If Only Musical.  Oxford University Press, 2009 
 Ekaterina Kouprovskaia : Edison Denisov, monographie. Aedam Musicae, 2017  
 Купровская Е. Мой муж Эдисон Денисов. — М.: Музыка, 2014 
 Ценова B. Не­из­вест­ный Де­ни­сов. М., 1997 
    
 Свет. Доб­ро. Веч­ность. Па­мя­ти Э. Де­ни­со­ва. Ста­тьи. Вос­по­ми­на­ния. Ма­те­риа­лы. М. 1999

External links
 Official website dedicated to Edison Denisov (English, Russian & French)

 Edison Denisov at wikilivres.ru (Russian & English)
Edison Denisov at news.google.com
Edison Denisov at books.google.com
Edison Denisov at scholar.google.com
Edison Denisov at jstor.org
List of works (Sikorski catalogue, English & German) 
List of works (Russian) 
 Short biography (Sikorski Publishers, German) 
Brief bio at "Boosey & Hawkes"
Denissov. Catalogue des oeuvres, discographie, bibliographie (French)
 Composer of Light by Dmitri Smirnov (English)
Fragments on Denisov by Dmitri Smirnov & Elena Firsova (Russian)
The texts of his vocal works at "Recmusic"
Interview with Edison Denisov in Ruza Composers Colony near Moscow, July 1988
Interview with Edison Denisov by Bruce Duffie, May 16, 1991
Edison Denisov, the friend of our family by Natalia Bondy (SpecialRadio, June 2016, russian text)

1929 births
1996 deaths
20th-century classical composers
20th-century Russian male musicians
Chevaliers of the Légion d'honneur
Commandeurs of the Ordre des Arts et des Lettres
Honored Artists of the RSFSR
Male opera composers
Members of the Academy of Arts, Berlin
Moscow Conservatory alumni
People from Tomsk
People's Artists of Russia
Pupils of Vissarion Shebalin
Russian male classical composers
Russian opera composers
Soviet male classical composers
Tomsk State University alumni